Rajali is a 1996 Indian Tamil-language action-adventure film directed by Velu Prabhakaran and written by R. K. Selvamani. The film stars Ramki and Napoleon whilst Roja and Mansoor Ali Khan play supporting roles. It was released on 17 April 1996.

Plot

Cast 

Ramki as Jeeva
Napoleon as Rajali
Roja as Rani
Mansoor Ali Khan as Rani's uncle
S. S. Rajendran  as Shekhar
Surendra Pal as Rathnavelu
Vichithra as Rani's friend
Vadivukkarasi as Rani's mother
Raja in a guest appearance
Silk Smitha in a guest appearance
Disco Shanti in a guest appearance

Soundtrack 
Soundtrack is composed by debutant Aravind and lyrics by Piraisoodan.

Release 
Kalki wrote the film looks like a bunch of good technicians got together and sprayed a bag of garbage. The film, along with Velu Prabhakaran's other venture Asuran (1995) which released during the same period, did not perform well at the box office.

References

External links 
 

1990s Tamil-language films
1996 films
Films directed by Velu Prabhakaran
Treasure hunt films